Connla was the son of Cú Chulainn in Irish mythology.

Connla or Conle may also refer to:

 Connla the Ruddy, fictional son of Conn of the Hundred Battles
 Connla Cáem, historical High King of Ireland sometime during the period 463–205 BC
 Henning Conle (born 1944), German billionaire
 Connla mac Bressail Bricc, ancestor of the Ossorians in medieval Ireland
 Connla (band), folk music band from Northern Ireland